Oakajee is a locality in the Mid West region of Western Australia, about  north of the city of Geraldton.

Oakajee was a location on the Northampton railway line between 1879 and 1957.

The area was associated with the Oakajee Port proposal, a project with a long history of attempts to secure funding for construction, the most recent having stalled in 2014.

References 

Mid West (Western Australia)
Coastal towns in Western Australia